Head of an Old Greek Woman  is a painting completed in 1824 by the French Romantic artist Eugène Delacroix. It is a study for his large oil painting The Massacre at Chios ("Scène des massacres de Scio"); a depiction of the Chios massacre which occurred in 1821 during the Greek War of Independence. The final work was completed for that year's Paris Salon. The final work was heavily influenced by both Spanish influenced and the French artist Théodore Géricault, and shows the woman in full-length seated to the right next to a gruesomely depicted female corspe.

The painting is bust-length and small at  × . It was painted from life with oil on canvas or graphite. The image is tightly cropped, emphasising her fearful and near weeping gaze. Her black dress, long dark hair, face and neck are rendered using chiaroscuro, although the final image is far more colourful.

Head of a Woman is held at the Fine Arts museum of Orléans, France. A near contemporary copy is in the Metropolitan Museum of Art, New York.

References

Sources
 Allard, Sébastian. Delacroix. Yale University Press, 2018. 
 Tinterow, Garry. Manet/Velazquez: The French Taste for Spanish Painting. Metropolitan Museum of Art, 2003. 

1823 paintings
Paintings by Eugène Delacroix